This page documents all tornadoes confirmed by various weather forecast offices of the National Weather Service in the United States during January, February, and March 2021. January has an average of 35 tornadoes in the United States, February averages 29, and March averages 80.

The year started well below average with the lowest amount of tornado reports through two months in the past 16 years. January saw only 16 tornadoes, while February saw only 11. March, however, saw several outbreaks and was above average with 139 tornadoes.

United States yearly total

January

January 1 event

January 4 event

January 6 event

January 25 event

January 27 event

January 30 event

February

February 6 event

February 14 event

February 15 event

February 28 event

March

March 1 event

March 12 event

March 13 event

March 14 event

March 15 event

March 16 event

March 17 event

'

March 18 event

March 19 event

March 22 event

March 23 event

March 24 event

March 25 event

March 26 event

March 27 event

March 28 event

March 30 event

March 31 event

See also
 Tornadoes of 2021
 List of United States tornadoes from October to December 2020
 List of United States tornadoes from April to May 2021

Notes

References

2021-related lists
Tornadoes of 2021
Tornadoes
2021, 1
2021 natural disasters in the United States
Tornadoes in the United States